Silicon nanowires, also referred to as SiNWs, are a type of semiconductor nanowire most often formed from a silicon precursor by etching of a solid or through catalyzed growth from a vapor or liquid phase. Such nanowires have promising applications in lithium ion batteries, thermoelectrics and sensors. Initial synthesis of SiNWs is often accompanied by thermal oxidation steps to yield structures of accurately tailored size and morphology.

SiNWs have unique properties that are not seen in bulk (three-dimensional) silicon materials. These properties arise from an unusual quasi one-dimensional electronic structure and are the subject of research across numerous disciplines and applications. The reason that SiNWs are considered one of the most important one-dimensional materials is they could have a function as building blocks for nanoscale electronics assembled without the need for complex and costly fabrication facilities. SiNWs are frequently studied towards applications including photovoltaics, nanowire batteries, thermoelectrics and non-volatile memory.

Applications

Owing to their unique physical and chemical properties, silicon nanowires are a promising candidate for a wide range of applications that draw on their unique physico-chemical characteristics, which differ from those of bulk silicon material.

SiNWs exhibit charge trapping behavior which renders such systems of value in applications necessitating electron hole separation such as photovoltaics, and photocatalysts. Recent experiment on nanowire solar cells has led to a remarkable improvement of the power conversion efficiency of SiNW solar cells from <1% to >17% in the last few years.

Charge trapping behaviour and tuneable surface governed transport properties of SiNWs render this category of nanostructures of interest towards use as metal insulator semiconductors and field effect transistors, with further applications as nanoelectronic storage devices, in flash memory, logic devices as well as chemical and biological sensors.

The ability for lithium ions to intercalate into silicon structures renders various Si nanostructures of interest towards applications as anodes in Li-ion batteries (LiBs). SiNWs are of particular merit as such anodes as they exhibit the ability to undergo significant lithiation while maintaining structural integrity and electrical connectivity.

Silicon nanowires are efficient thermoelectric generators because they combine a high electrical conductivity, owing to the bulk properties of doped Si, with low thermal conductivity due to the small cross section.

Synthesis

Several synthesis methods are known for SiNWs and these can be broadly divided into methods which start with bulk silicon and remove material to yield nanowires, also known as top-down synthesis, and methods which use a chemical or vapor precursor to build nanowires in a process generally considered to be bottom-up synthesis.

Top down synthesis methods

These methods use material removal techniques to produce nanostructures from a bulk precursor

Laser beam ablation
Ion beam etching
Thermal evaporation oxide-assisted growth (OAG)
Metal-assisted chemical etching (MaCE)

Bottom-up synthesis methods

Vapour liquid solid (VLS) growth – a type of catalysed CVD often using silane as Si precursor and gold nanoparticles as catalyst (or 'seed'). 
Molecular beam epitaxy – a form of PVD applied in plasma environment
Precipitation from a solution – A variation of the VLS method, aptly named supercritical fluid liquid solid (SFLS), that uses a supercritical fluid (e.g. organosilane at high temperature and pressure) as Si precursor instead of vapor. The catalyst would be a colloid in solution, such as colloidal gold nanoparticles, and the SiNWs are grown in this solution

Thermal oxidation

Subsequent to physical or chemical processing, either top-down or bottom-up, to obtain initial silicon nanostructures, thermal oxidation steps are often applied in order to obtain materials with desired size and aspect ratio. Silicon nanowires exhibit a distinct and useful self-limiting oxidation behaviour whereby oxidation effectively ceases due to diffusion limitations, which can be modeled. This phenomenon allows accurate control of dimensions and aspect ratios in SiNWs and has been used to obtain high aspect ratio SiNWs with diameters below 5 nm. The self-limiting oxidation of SiNWs is of value towards lithium ion battery materials.

Orientation of nanowires

The orientation of SiNWs has profound influence on the structural and electronic properties of  the systems. For this reason several procedures have been proposed for the alignment of nanowires in chosen orientations. This includes the use of electric fields in polar alignment, electrophoresis, mircofluidic methods and contact printing.

Outlook

There is significant interest in SiNWs for their unique properties and the ability to control size and aspect ratio with great accuracy. As yet, limitations in large-scale fabrication impede the uptake of this material in the full range of investigated applications. Combined studies of synthesis methods, oxidation kinetics and properties of SiNW systems aim to overcome the present limitations and facilitate the implementation of SiNW systems, for example, high quality vapor-liquid-solid–grown SiNWs with smooth surfaces can be reversibly stretched with 10% or more elastic strain, approaching the theoretical elastic limit of silicon, which could open the doors for the emerging “elastic strain engineering” and flexible bio-/nano-electronics.

References

Materials
Nanotechnology
Nanoelectronics
Nanomaterials
Nanowire
Silicon